Pleurocidin is an antimicrobial peptide found in the mucus secreted by the skin of the winter flounder (Pleuronectes americanus). It exhibits broad-spectrum antimicrobial activity. Pleurocidin assumes an amphipathic alpha-helical conformation similar to other linear antimicrobial peptides and may play a role in innate host defence.

Potential Applications
Pleurocidin has been noted for its potential use in food safety, in part due to its heat stable properties and clinically demonstrated effectiveness against common food-borne microorganisms.

References

Protein families
Antimicrobial peptides